Chilakamarti Lakshmi Narasimham (26 September 1867 – 17 June 1946) was an Indian playwright, novelist and author of short stories, who wrote in the Telugu language. He was a romantic and a social reformer in the tradition founded by Veeresalingam. His best-known plays are probably Gayopakhyanam (1909) and Ganapati (1920).

Narasimham was visually impaired since his youth, and became blind after his graduation. He nonetheless served as an instructor in Telugu at the Government Arts College in Rajahmundry.  He was active in the Indian independence movement; he eschewed "foreign cloth" and wore khādī dhoti, shirt, coat and turban.

Early life
Chilakamarti Lakshmi Narasimham was born on 26 September 1867 in a Dravida Brahmin family of Aaraama Dravidulu Sect. He was born at Khandavalli village in West Godavari district at the residence of his maternal uncle. His father's name is Chilakamarti Venkanna and mother's name is Venkataratnamma and were residents of Veeravasaram village in West Godavari district.

Narasimham's earlier name was Punniah and was later named after a popular temple deity Lakshmi Narasimha Swamy of Antarvedi village. According to his autobiography, his aunt's daughter Punnamma died after giving birth to a child. Narasimham's mother saw her in her dream and was asked to name Narasimham after her. Later, Narasimham's father and paternal grand mother did not like the name and changed it.

As a boy, he was said to resemble his maternal grandfather, Bhadraiah Sastry who died a year before the grandson was born. His body, height, tonal quality, poetic talent, together with a sort of purblindness (sic) where all inherited from the grandfather. Due to his partial blindness, he had trouble walking alone in the nights and was unable to read during nights. He was unable to see the numbers written on the blackboard and unable to catch ball while playing. He used to take help from his friends who used to read aloud the school lessons for him.

At the age of five, his Upanayanam, the sacred thread ceremony was performed. His father tried a lot to make Narasimham learn Sandhyavandanam by sending him to his grandfather's village Khandavalli, his aunt's villages Velagadurru and Manchili. Finally, he stayed in Matsyapuri village near Veeravasaram for several months and learned Trikaala Sandhyavandanam.

Schooling
Narasimham joined "Velicheti Vari" school in his village Veeravasaram. Narasimham wrote in his autobiography that Velicheti Rayappagaru and Velicheti Bhadrachalamgaru who used to run the school are his first gurus. He later joined the school run by Somanchi Narasayyagaru where he learned to read gilakala padhyaalu with beautiful voice which was appreciated by his teacher. He later went to Kondapalli with his uncle Mallayya Sastry and joined the Mission school. But both of them had to leave Kondapalli due to health reasons.

At the age of 11, in 1878, Narasimham joined the Mission school in Veeravasaram in first standard (equivalent of today's sixth standard). He completed third standard in 1880 but he used to dislike Mathematics subject. To quote from his autobiography, "I used to be very poor in mathematics when I was in third standard. I used to perform very well in Telugu, English, History, Geography but my ability in Mathematics is limited". He attributed his lack of interest in the subject and his poor vision as the reasons for this. He completed his education in Veeravasaram in 1881. He secured first class in the Comparative Examination held in December 1881. For higher studies, one has to go to Narasapuram.

Literature
Kandukuri Veeresalingam is reckoned as the chief architect of the Renaissance of Telugu literature in the later half of the nineteenth century. But due to the enormity of his service as a social reformer in comparison with that of his work as a pioneer in modern Telugu literature, he is looked upon by the people as a reformer. As a writer, he was the first to try his hand at many of the modern literary forms such as minor poem, burlesque, biography, autobiography, novel, satire, farce and plays. If Veeresalingam was the path-finder in this respect, Chilakamarti was a torch-bearer along the path, as the former went on breaking new grounds. Both of them were versatile writers in verse and as well as in prose. The literary output of both of them was conspicuously voluminous. There was practically no genre left untouched by them except in one or two spheres.

In almost all his works, be it verse or prose, the way in which Chilkamarti narrated the incident instantaneously captured the reader's mind. The imageries he presented in detail, the way in which he unfolded the story with a special technique of narration, the diction he employed with familiar expression intelligible even to the average reader, above all, the sincerity of purpose with which he wrote went a long way for the success and popularity of his works.

The earliest work Keechaka vadha, a stage play, was written in 1889; the last work Bammera Potana, an incomplete play, was written in 1946, the year in which Chilkamarti died. Another incomplete play Harischandra was also probably written in 1946. The works of Chilkamarti can be broadly classified into verses, plays, Prahasanas, novels, long stories and biographies of great men and autobiography.

Verses
The earliest verses were written by him in the year 1887 on the occasion of the golden jubilee celebrations of Queen Victoria's rule. A number of extempore verses and verses recited at several meetings come under one category. Satakas (containing not less than hundred verses) come under another category. If the verses written for plays are also taken into consideration, they form a third category. In 1910, he wrote in Telugu verses, a concise Ramayana of Valmiki.

Plays

His plays could be classified into two categories. The first category is the independent and the original, though the theme was borrowed from the classical and epic poems. The second category is translations from Sanskrit plays.

Original Plays
 Keechaka Vadha – 1889
 Droupadi Parinayamu – 1889
 Sri Rama Jananamu – 1889
 Gayopakhyanamu/Prachanda Yadavam – 1890
 Parijatapaharanamu – 1890
 Nala Natakamu – 1890
 Seetha Kalyanamu – 1890
 Prasanna Yadavamu – 1905
 Prahlada Charitamu – 1907
 Chatura Chandrahasa – 1907
 Tilottama – 1907

Incomplete Plays
 Bammera Potana – 1946
 Harischandra – 1946

Plays Translated from Sanskrit

 Parvathi Parinayamu of Bana – 1899
 Bhasa Natakachakram – 1909–1927
 Dula Vakyamu
 Karna Bharamu
 Duta Ghatotkachamu
 Uru Bhangamu
 Madhyama Vyayogamu
 Pancha Ratnamu
 Pratijna Yougandharayanamu
 Swapna Vasavadattamu
 Bala Charitamu
 Charudattamu
 Avimarakamu
 Pratima
 Abhishekamu

Novels
Chilakamarti wrote original novels as well as translated English novels. His novels mainly consisted of either social themes or epic themes.

Ramachandra Vijayam (1894), Ganapathi (1981–21), Rajaratnam (1918–21) and Vijayalakshmi are purely social novels.

Hemalatha (1896), Ahalyabai (1897), Krishnaveni (1911), Karpoora Manjari (1907–27), Mani Manjari (1911), Suvarna Guptudu and Shapamu are historical novels, while Soundarya Tilaka is partly of the epic content. Chilakamarti is called Andhra Scott after the famous Scottish historical novelist Walter Scott.

Chilakamarti translated two English novels written by Bengali author Ramesh Chandra Dutt, The Lake of Palms and The Slave Girl of Agra under the titles Sudha Saraschandram(1909–27) and Dasikanya respectively. Shyamala is another novel written by Chilakamarti based on the Macbeth play of William Shakespeare.

Stories

He translated the book The Annals and Antiquities of Rajasthan or the Central and Western Rajpoot States of India by Colonel James Tod under the title Rajasthana Kathavali around 1906–07. It consisted of twenty four stories of the royal dynasties of Rajasthan published in two volumes.

Biographies

Autobiography
At the request of his friends, despite his blindness and old age (75 years), Chilakamarti wrote his 646 pages long autobiography Sweeyacharitamu in 4 months and 24 days from 18 March 1942 to 12 July 1942. Due to his lack of sight and unavailability of written records, he recollected his entire life story from memory which included very detailed incidents, dates and people names. With all his modesty, he apologises to the readers for having written his autobiography for which he does not consider himself to be worthy. According to,

Saraswathi Monthly Magazine
Chintamani monthly magazine started by Nyapathi Subbarao moved to Chennai when
Veeresalingam left Rajahmundry. Therefore, Chilakamarti thought that there should be a good monthly magazine in Andhra. He conveyed the same to Polavaram zamindar Kochcherlakota Ramachandra Venkata Krishna Rao Bahadur. On his approval, Chilakamarti started "Saraswathi" monthly magazine in Rajahmundry. Krishna Rao Bahadur acted as editor and Chilakamarti worked as sub-editor.

Manorama Monthly Magazine
In 1906, Chilakamarti started "Manorama" monthly magazine. It used to get published in Gunneswara Rao printing press. Later in 1908, Chilakamarti bought some part of Vivekavardhini printing press and named as Manorama printing press.

By 1907, the magazine subscription reached four hundred. Under the heading of Swavishayam (English translation: own matters), Chilakamarti used to write some essays. He announced in the magazine that they will publish more bravery related stories, life history of great men from Maharashtra and three plays.

Desamatha Weekly Magazine
"Towards of end of 1909, I thought that along with the Manorama monthly magazine, a weekly magazine should also be started"

In Desamatha magazine, an editorial, a story or a pictorial story, humour related articles used to be published, most of which will be written by Chilakamarti himself. The magazine was profitable due to large number of subscriptions and court auction advertisements.

Desamatha faced problems after sometime due to the new rule by the British that nothing against British should be published. The British used to monitor the magazine and its subscriptions. But Chilakamarti did not like the magazine to be a subsidised paper. He thought that running the magazine according to the rules of British is equivalent to the selling of one's own soul.

References

Telugu people
19th-century Indian dramatists and playwrights
Indian male novelists
Indian blind people
1867 births
1946 deaths
Telugu-language writers
Andhra University alumni
Indian male dramatists and playwrights
Telugu-language dramatists and playwrights
20th-century Indian dramatists and playwrights
20th-century Indian novelists
People from West Godavari district
Novelists from Andhra Pradesh
19th-century Indian novelists
19th-century Indian male writers
Dramatists and playwrights from Andhra Pradesh
20th-century Indian male writers
English–Telugu translators